Elisabeth (or Elizabeth) of Bohemia may refer to: 

Elisabeth Richeza of Poland (1286–1335), daughter of Przemysl II of Poland and wife of Wenceslaus II of Bohemia.
Elisabeth of Bohemia (1292–1330), daughter of Wenceslaus II of Bohemia and wife of John of Luxemburg, King of Bohemia.
Elisabeth of Bohemia (1358–1373), daughter of Charles IV of Luxemburg, Holy Roman Emperor and King of Bohemia.
Elisabeth of Pomerania (1347–1393), wife of Charles IV of Luxemburg, Holy Roman Emperor and King of Bohemia.
Elisabeth, Duchess of Luxembourg (1390–1451), granddaughter of Charles IV of Luxemburg.
Elisabeth of Bohemia (1409–1442), queen consort of Hungary
Elisabeth of Austria (1436–1505), daughter of Albert II, Holy Roman Emperor, King of Bohemia and Hungary, and Elisabeth of Bohemia, wife of Casimir IV of Poland.
Elizabeth Stuart (1596–1662), daughter of James VI/I of Scotland and England, wife of Frederick V, Elector Palatine and King of Bohemia.
Elisabeth of the Palatinate (also called "Elizabeth of Bohemia") (1618–1680), daughter of Frederick V, Elector Palatine, and Elizabeth Stuart, philosopher and correspondent of Descartes.

See also
Elisabeth of Luxembourg (disambiguation)